James Norman Hall (22 April 1887 – 5 July 1951) was an American writer best known for The Bounty Trilogy, three historical novels he wrote with Charles Nordhoff: Mutiny on the Bounty (1932), Men Against the Sea (1934) and Pitcairn's Island (1934). During World War I, Hall had the distinction of serving in the militaries of three Western allies: Great Britain as an infantryman, and then France and the United States as an aviator. His awards include the Croix de Guerre, the Médaille Militaire, the Légion d'Honneur and the Distinguished Service Cross. After the war, Hall spent much of his life on the island of Tahiti, where he and Nordhoff wrote a number of successful adventure books, many adapted for film. He was also the father of Conrad L. Hall, regarded as one of the ten most influential cinematographers in film history.

Biography

Hall was born in Colfax, Iowa, where he attended the local schools. His early home is listed on the National Register of Historic Places. Hall graduated from Grinnell College in 1910. He wrote the song "Sons of Old Grinnell", which is part of the college songbook.

After graduation, he became a social worker in Boston for the Society for Prevention to Cruelty to Children while trying to establish himself as a writer and studying for a master's degree from Harvard University.

Hall was on vacation in the United Kingdom in the summer of 1914, when World War I began. Posing as a Canadian, he enlisted in the British Army, serving in the Royal Fusiliers as a machine gunner during the Battle of Loos. He was discharged after his true nationality was discovered, and he returned to the United States. Hall's first book, Kitchener's Mob (1916), recounts his wartime experiences. Kitchener's Mob sold moderately well in America following its publication and after a speaking tour to promote the book, Hall returned to Europe in 1916 on assignment with Atlantic Monthly magazine. He was to have written a series of stories about the group of American volunteers serving in the Lafayette Escadrille, but after spending some time with the American fliers Hall himself became caught up in the adventure and enlisted in the French Air Service. By then the original Escadrille had been expanded to the Lafayette Flying Corps, which trained American volunteers to serve in regular French squadrons.

During his time in French aviation, Hall was awarded the Croix de Guerre with five palms and the Médaille Militaire. When the United States entered the war in 1917, Hall was made a captain in the Army Air Service. There he met another American pilot, Charles Nordhoff. After being shot down over enemy lines on 7 May 1918, Hall spent the last months of the war as a German prisoner of war. After his release he was awarded the French Légion d'Honneur and the American Distinguished Service Cross.

After the war, Hall spent much of his life on the island of Tahiti, where he and Nordhoff, who had also moved there, wrote a number of successful adventure books (including the Bounty trilogy). In addition to the various Bounty films, other film adaptations of his fiction include The Hurricane (1937), which starred his nephew Jon Hall; Passage to Marseille (1944), featuring Humphrey Bogart; and Botany Bay (1953), with Alan Ladd.

In 1940, Hall published a book of poems with the title Oh Millersville! It appeared under the pseudonym Fern Gravel, and the poems were written in the voice of a girl of about 10 years of age. The book was critically well received, and the hoax was not exposed until 1946, when Hall published an article entitled "Fern Gravel: A Hoax and a Confession" in the Atlantic Monthly. He wrote that he had been inspired by a dream in which he saw himself back in his Iowa childhood with a group of children, among whom was a girl named Fern who wanted her poems written down. When he awoke, Hall wrote Fern's poems, which are simply worded but nicely detailed first-person observations of small-town life.

In 1925, Hall married Sarah (Lala) Winchester, who was part-Polynesian.  They had two children: the Academy Award winning cinematographer Conrad Hall (1926–2003) and Nancy Hall-Rutgers (born 1930). Hall died in 1951 in Tahiti and is buried on the hillside property just above the modest wooden house he and Lala lived in for many years. His grave bears a line of verse he wrote in Iowa at the age of 11: "Look to the Northward stranger / Just over the hillside there / Have you ever in your travels seen / A land more passing fair?"

Hall's papers, including manuscripts and wartime correspondence, are housed in the Grinnell College Special Collections and Archives. The government of Tahiti restored Hall's home in Arue, French Polynesia, which is now a historic house museum that includes Hall's 3,000-volume library and personal effects on loan from the Hall family. "The house itself is neither large nor prepossessing; it was built for comfort and practicality," wrote author and screenwriter Peter Benchley. "It's what's inside the house that I found most fascinating: paintings, photographs, artifacts and anecdotes from Hall's preliterary life."

Selected works

The Bounty trilogy, with Charles Nordhoff
 Mutiny on the Bounty (1932)
 Men Against the Sea (1934)
 Pitcairn's Island (1934)
 The Bounty Trilogy (illustrated by N. C. Wyeth) (1940)

Other works

 Kitchener's Mob: The Adventures of an American in the British Army (1916)
 High Adventure: A Narrative of Air Fighting in France (1918)
 History of the Lafayette Flying Corps (with Charles Nordhoff) (1920) 
 Faery Lands of the South Seas (with Charles Nordhoff) (1920)
 On the Stream of Travel (1926)
 Mid-Pacific (1928)
 Falcons of France (with Charles Nordhoff) (1929). Nordhoff and Hall's account of their service in the famed Lafayette Escadrille during World War I.
 Flying with Chaucer (1930)
 Mother Goose Land (1930)
 Tale of a Shipwreck (1934). Hall recounts his voyage to Pitcairn's Island and shipwreck at Temoe in 1933.  Includes early versions of passages from Pitcairn's Island. This was first published as "From Med to Mum" in the Atlantic Monthly, March through July 1934. 
 The Hurricane (with Charles Nordhoff) (1936)
 The Dark River (with Charles Nordhoff) (1938)
 Dictator of the Americas (1938)
 The Friends (1939)
 No More Gas (with Charles Nordhoff) (1940)
 Doctor Dogbody's Leg (1940)
 [as Fern Gravel] Oh Millersville! Muscatine, IA.: The Prairie Press (1940)
 Botany Bay (with Charles Nordhoff) (1941)
 Under a Thatched Roof (essays) (1942)
 Men Without a Country (with Charles Nordhoff) (1942)
 Lost Island (1944)
 The High Barbaree (with Charles Nordhoff) (1945)
 A Word for His Sponsor: A Narrative Poem (1949)
 The Far Lands (1950)
 The Forgotten One and Other True Tales of the South Seas (1952)
 Her Daddy's Best Ice Cream (1952)
 My Island Home: An Autobiography (1952)
 "Sing: A Song of Sixpence" in 125 Years of the Atlantic, pp. 303–313

See also
The James Norman Hall House in Colfax, Iowa is listed on the National Register of Historic Places.
The James Norman Hall Papers are housed at the Grinnell College Special Collections and Archives.

Notes

External links

 James Norman Hall's Home, Hall family website
 
 
 
 

1887 births
1951 deaths
20th-century American essayists
20th-century American male writers
20th-century American memoirists
20th-century American novelists
American autobiographers
American male essayists
American male novelists
American military personnel of World War I
American military writers
American prisoners of war
American prisoners of war in World War I
American World War I pilots
Grinnell College alumni
Harvard University alumni
Lafayette Escadrille
Military personnel from Iowa
Novelists from Iowa
People from Colfax, Iowa
Recipients of the Distinguished Service Cross (United States)
Royal Fusiliers soldiers
Shot-down aviators
United States Army Air Service pilots of World War I
World War I prisoners of war held by Germany
Writing duos